Gibraltar Point may refer to:

 Gibraltar Point, Lincolnshire, a national nature reserve located in England
 Gibraltar Point Lighthouse, a lighthouse located in Toronto, Canada
 Gibraltar Point Blockhouse, a blockhouse located in Toronto, Canada
 Europa Point, the southernmost point of Gibraltar